Talaash (English: "The Search") is an Indian drama series that aired in 1992 on Doordarshan. It is based on the novel Sonar Kathi Rupor Kathi by Ashutosh Mukherjee. The title song sung by Suresh Wadekar and lyrics by Yogesh was remake of song Tum Pukar Lo.

Plot 
As the name suggests this is a story of search of old lost family friend of the lead character. Shankarlal Shrivastava  Alok Nath is an author who is returning from a function by train. On the way back he is passing from a village "Sarsavan", name of which strikes him prominently but he cannot remember the relation. Once he gets down the train and goes in that village he realizes the link. The last letter from Sudhir (Vijayendra Ghatge), Shankarlal's close family friend was sent from this village. Sudhir is the son of Shankarlal's mother's closest friend who consider themselves as sisters. The two families are very close to each other. On insistence of his mother Sudhir takes a job and leaves the family. Shankarlal takes care of Sudhir's mother in her last days. However, unfortunately after some days there is no contact from Sudhir and all ties are lost. The last and very faint tie is the place from where Sudhir had sent his last letter which is from village ‘Sarsavan’. It is then the story of Shankarlal's quest to find his long lost friend and to know the reason and consequences why he disappeared.

Cast

 Alok Nath as Shankarlal Shrivastava the author and lead character.
 Beena as Shankarlal's wife.
 Vijayendra Ghatge as Sudhir the long lost friend of Shankarlal.
 Moushumi Chatterjee as Urmila/Behenaji.
 Dina Pathak as Sudhir's mother.
 Avtar Gill as Mukhiya Veeru
Pallavi Joshi as Junglee, Mukhiya's daughter
Rajendra Gupta as Fardu
Sushmita Mukherjee as Janaki
Asha Sharma as Rani Ma/Ahilya
Goga Kapoor as Raja
Neelima Azeem as Pramila
Manoj Verma as Kanhaiya
Chandrakant Gokhale as Mishra ji

Reference

External links
 Episode of the series on ‘Youtube’.
 

DD National original programming
Indian drama television series
1992 Indian television series debuts
Television shows based on Indian novels
Films based on works by Ashutosh Mukhopadhyay